Yehiel Moshe "Hili" Tropper (born 22 April 1978) is an Israeli educator, social worker and politician. He is currently a member of the Knesset for National Unity and served as Minister of Culture and Sports from 2020 to 2022.

Biography
Tropper was born in Jerusalem, one of nine children of Rabbi Daniel Tropper. During his national service in the Israel Defense Forces, he was part of the Duvdevan Unit. He subsequently became a social worker and earned a BA in humanities from the Open University and an MA in Jewish history and education from the Lander Institute. He worked for the Bat Yam municipality and also ran the Branco Weiss school in Ramle.

Tropper is married with four children and lives in Nes Harim.

Political career
Prior to the 2013 Knesset elections Tropper was placed twenty-third on the Labor Party list, but the party won only 15 seats. He was subsequently appointed as an advisor to Minister of Education Shai Piron. When Piron left the government in 2015, Tropper became Director of the Education, Welfare and Culture Division in Yeruham.

In the build-up to the April 2019 elections he joined the new Israel Resilience Party founded by his friend Benny Gantz. The party became part of the Blue and White, with Tropper placed twelfth on the alliance's list. He was elected to the Knesset as Blue and White won 35 seats. He was re-elected in September 2019 and March 2020. In May 2020 he was appointed Minister of Culture and Sports in the new government. He subsequently resigned his Knesset seat under the Norwegian Law and was replaced by Yorai Lahav-Hertzano. He was re-elected to the Knesset in the March 2021 elections. After being appointed Minister of Culture and Sports in the new government, he resigned from the Knesset under the Norwegian Law and was replaced by Mufid Mari.

References

External links

1978 births
Living people
People from Jerusalem
Israeli social workers
Israeli educators
Jewish Israeli politicians
Open University of Israel alumni
Lander Institute alumni
Members of the 21st Knesset (2019)
Members of the 22nd Knesset (2019–2020)
Members of the 23rd Knesset (2020–2021)
Members of the 24th Knesset (2021–2022)
Members of the 25th Knesset (2022–)
Israel Resilience Party politicians
Blue and White (political alliance) politicians
Ministers of Sport of Israel
Government ministers of Israel
Ministers of Culture of Israel